Cuba–United Kingdom relations are the bilateral relations between Cuba and the United Kingdom.

Trade
In 1964, Cuba ordered ten diesel-electric locomotives similar to the British Rail Class 47 from a British manufacturer.

Relations
In 2019, the UK's Prince Charles paid an official visit to Cuba.

In 2021, Cuba and the UK announced intentions to strengthen their bilateral relations.

References

See also
List of ambassadors of the United Kingdom to Cuba
Cubans in the United Kingdom

 
United Kingdom
Cuba